The following is a list of the 39 cantons of the Pas-de-Calais department, in France, following the French canton reorganisation which came into effect in March 2015:

 Aire-sur-la-Lys
 Arras-1
 Arras-2
 Arras-3
 Auchel
 Auxi-le-Château
 Avesnes-le-Comte
 Avion
 Bapaume
 Berck
 Béthune
 Beuvry
 Boulogne-sur-Mer-1
 Boulogne-sur-Mer-2
 Brebières
 Bruay-la-Buissière
 Bully-les-Mines
 Calais-1
 Calais-2
 Calais-3
 Carvin
 Desvres
 Douvrin
 Étaples
 Fruges
 Harnes
 Hénin-Beaumont-1
 Hénin-Beaumont-2
 Lens
 Liévin
 Lillers
 Longuenesse
 Lumbres
 Marck
 Nœux-les-Mines
 Outreau
 Saint-Omer
 Saint-Pol-sur-Ternoise
 Wingles

References